Oasis LRT station is an elevated Light Rail Transit (LRT) station on the Punggol LRT line East Loop in Punggol, Singapore, located at Punggol Drive between the junctions of Edgefield Plains and Edgedale Plains. It was opened on 15 June 2007, more than two years after the rest of the line opened (except for Damai) on 29 January 2005 after more residents had moved into the HDB flats adjacent to the station. Previously, residents in the area had to take a ten minutes walk to the nearest bus stop, as there were no bus services serving the station's vicinity. It is located next to Oasis Terraces and Punggol Polyclinic.

Etymology

The station took its name of Punggol Oasis Residents' Committee (RC) near the station.

References

Railway stations in Singapore opened in 2007
Punggol
LRT stations in Punggol
Railway stations in Punggol
Light Rail Transit (Singapore) stations